This is a list of episodes from 2008 for the Stuff You Should Know podcast

2008 season

References

External links 
Podcast Archive

Lists of radio series episodes